Wang Yun (1228–1304), was a writer of Chinese Sanqu poetry from Weizhou in Henan province. He was born during the Jin dynasty, but became an official under the Yuan Dynasty. Initially a local official, he was given a series of appointments in Hebei, Henan, Shantong and Fujian provinces starting in 1268. Later he was summoned to the capital where he served in the Hanlin Academy. At twenty he became the acquaintance of the renowned writer Yuan Haowen. He was a noted prose stylist in the Tang manner of unadorned directness. His poetry often depicted the downtrodden and the poor. His collected works in one-hundred fascicles is extant. A biography of Wang exists in the official history of the Yuan Dynasty. Forty-one of his sanqu are extant.

Translations 
(Yuediao: Pinghuyue)

Untitled

1.

Autumn green lotuses

And a calm lake stitched with clouds.

A cassia boat sews the moistness.

A song, a full cup of wine

Relieve the sorrow.

How can a man's life be as before?

When drunk I remember;

Then as now there were flowering branches,

Though now they blush above this old man's head.

(Yuediao: Pinghuyue)

On the Birthday of Mrs. Li

1.

The eyes enjoy a person at peace.

Your bracelets and ornaments are graced with fragrance.

The gem in the grotto shows its luster.

Eight thousand springs!

Mists announce this letter of long life,

I buy another cup of wine.

You, goddess by the vast sea,

Watch in peace

The stirrings of the world's dust.

See also
 Qu (poetry)

References 
 Hu Qiaomu ed., The Great Encyclopedia of China, Chinese Literature, vol. 2, Beijing-Shanghai, 1986, p. 910.
 Lu Weifen and Wu Gengshun ed., Complete Yuan Period Sanqu Lyrics, Liaoning, 2000, vol. 1, pp. 144–51.
 Ma Liangchun　and Li Futian ed., The Great Encyclopedia of Chinese Literature, Tianlu, 1991, vol. 2, p. 658.
 Carpenter, Bruce E. 'Chinese San-ch’ü Poetry of the Mongol Era: I', Tezukayama Daigaku kiyo (Journal of Tezukayama University), Nara, Japan, no. 22, pp. 34–5.

1228 births
1304 deaths
Yuan dynasty poets
Jin dynasty (1115–1234) people
Politicians from Xinxiang
Poets from Henan
Yuan dynasty politicians
Writers from Xinxiang